Kosovo unrests may refer to:

1981 protests in Kosovo
Insurgency in Kosovo (1995–1998)
Kosovo War
2004 unrest in Kosovo
2008 unrest in Kosovo
North Kosovo crisis (disambiguation)
 North Kosovo crisis (2011–2013)
 2021 North Kosovo crisis
2022 North Kosovo crisis